Gate Hill Cooperative, also known as The Land, is an experimental artists’ colony and intentional community located in Stony Point, Rockland County, New York. It is often viewed as an extension of Black Mountain College in Western North Carolina.

Founding community 
Gate Hill Cooperative was founded in 1953 by former Black Mountain College (BMC) students Paul and Vera Williams. Its inspiration came from playwright and critic Paul Goodman's publication Communitas: Means of Livelihood and Ways of Life and his teaching when he served as faculty at the BMC Summer Institute of 1950. 

The group forming the immediate basis for the Gate Hill Cooperative included BMC instructors Karen Karnes, David Weinrib, John Cage (later joined by Merce Cunningham), David Tudor, and poet and potter M.C. Richards, whose ideas on community living were also a major catalyst for the creation of the cooperative. Among the artists, composers, filmmakers, choreographers, poets, and potters who moved to Gate Hill Cooperative later on were BMC alumni Ray Johnson and Stan VanDerBeek. Individuals who joined the community without a prior association with BMC included Sari Dienes and Paul and Ethel Hultberg .

Founders Paul and Vera Williams lived at Gate Hill Cooperative until their divorce in 1970. Potter Karen Karnes stayed for twenty-five years, until the late 1970s, providing the community with a key source of income through sales of her ceramics. Of its original community, the experimental composer David Tudor remained the longest on The Land, working out of his studio there until 1995.

Connection to 20th-century avant-garde 
Although the community privileged a rural, rustic lifestyle with an emphasis on family life, it was also linked to the international avant-garde and the New York City experimental arts scene of the late 1950s and early 1960s. It saw frequent visitors from NYC and became the site of both organized and ad hoc events associated with Fluxus, Happenings, Judson Dance Theater, Expanded Cinema, and intermedia and other movements fostered by interdisciplinary and transitory creative collaboration.

The poet Robert Duncan, who had been one of the last remaining faculty members at Black Mountain College before its closure in 1957, was critical of the New York avant-garde scene, but saw Gate Hill as a positive exception. He wrote to James Broughton during a visit in June 1956 that his time with M.C. Richards and John Cage there "inspires what shreds of art I have left for such climates."

Gate Hill Cooperative attracted significant press attention and an increase in visitors in 1966 due to the unveiling of Stan VanDerBeek's prototype structure for his Movie-Drome, an immersive audiovisual environment built using the top of a grain silo. The Movie-Drome garnered national media coverage in Newsweek, Film Culture and the Village Voice, and the Lincoln Center sponsored a bus tour to visit it, attracting visitors including Shirley Clarke, Ed Emshwiller, Agnes Varda, Andy Warhol, and Annette Michelson. Art historian Gloria Sutton states that the visitors received "a hand-sketched map circulated by VanDerBeek ... with the northern most tip of Manhattan being the last discernable signpost."  

Other visitors throughout the 1960s who contributed to the experimental artistic atmosphere were composers Karlheinz Stockhausen, Pierre Boulez, Morton Feldman; artists, Jasper Johns, Richard Lippold, Robert Rauschenberg, potter, Peter Voulkos, The Living Theatre’s Judith Malina and Julian Beck. Dancer and potter Paulus Berensohn claimed that visiting the Gate Hill Cooperative and seeing Karen Karnes work was a pivotal moment in his artistic career.

References 

Intentional communities in the United States
Artist colonies
1953 establishments in New York (state)